is a private junior college in Yoshimi, Saitama,  Japan, established in 1991.

External links
 Official website 

Japanese junior colleges
Educational institutions established in 1991
Private universities and colleges in Japan
Universities and colleges in Saitama Prefecture
1991 establishments in Japan